Sunkoshi Small Hydropower Plant is located in Dhuskun of Sindhupalchok District in central Nepal. It downstream where the Sunkoshi and Bhotekoshi Rivers meet. Construction on the plant began in 2003 and it was complete in 2005.

The plant is a Run- Of- River project with installed capacity of 2.5 MW, design flow of 2.7 m3/s and gross head of 124.5m.

This is only project in Nepal to utilize pressurized Glass Fibre reinforced Plastic (GRP) pipe for flow conduction.

The plant has two units with Turgo turbine (2 *1250 KW). The power is evacuated via 33kVA transmission line to switch-yard of Sunkoshi Hydropower Station (9MW)

The plant was completely submerged by 2014 Sunkoshi blockage.

See also
List of power stations in Nepal

References

Hydroelectric power stations in Nepal
Gravity dams
Run-of-the-river power stations
Dams in Nepal
Dams completed in 2005
2005 establishments in Nepal
Energy infrastructure completed in 2005